Lorraine Vivian Hansberry (May 19, 1930 – January 12, 1965) was a playwright and writer. She was the first African-American female author to have a play performed on Broadway. Her best-known work, the play A Raisin in the Sun, highlights the lives of black Americans in Chicago living under racial segregation. The title of the play was taken from the poem "Harlem" by Langston Hughes: "What happens to a dream deferred? Does it dry up like a raisin in the sun?" At the age of 29, she won the New York Drama Critics' Circle Award — making her the first African-American dramatist, the fifth woman, and the youngest playwright to do so. Hansberry's family had struggled against segregation, challenging a restrictive covenant in the 1940 US Supreme Court case Hansberry v. Lee.

After she moved to New York City, Hansberry worked at the Pan-Africanist newspaper Freedom, where she worked with other  intellectuals such as Paul Robeson and W. E. B. Du Bois. Much of her work during this time concerned the African struggles for liberation and their impact on the world. Hansberry's writings also discussed her lesbianism and the oppression of homosexuality. She died of pancreatic cancer at the age of 34. Hansberry inspired the Nina Simone song "To Be Young, Gifted and Black", whose title-line came from Hansberry's autobiographical play.

Early life and family
Lorraine Hansberry was the youngest of four children born to Carl Augustus Hansberry, a successful real-estate broker and Nannie Louise (born Perry), a driving school teacher and ward committeewoman.

In 1938, her father bought a house in the Washington Park Subdivision of the South Side of Chicago, incurring the wrath of some of their white neighbors. The latter's legal efforts to force the Hansberry family out culminated in the U.S. Supreme Court's decision in Hansberry v. Lee, . The restrictive covenant was ruled contestable, though not inherently invalid; these covenants were eventually ruled unconstitutional in Shelley v. Kraemer, .

Carl Hansberry was also a supporter of the Urban League and NAACP in Chicago. Both Hansberrys were active in the Chicago Republican Party. Carl died in 1946 when Lorraine was fifteen years old; "American racism helped kill him," she later said.

The Hansberry's were routinely visited by prominent black people, including sociology professor W. E. B. Du Bois , poet Langston Hughes, singer, actor, and political activist Paul Robeson, musician Duke Ellington, and Olympic gold medalist Jesse Owens.

Carl Hansberry's brother, William Leo Hansberry, founded the African Civilization section of the History Department at Howard University. Lorraine was taught: "Above all, there were two things which were never to be betrayed: the family and the race."

Lorraine Hansberry has many notable relatives including director and playwright Shauneille Perry, whose eldest child is named after her. Her grandniece is the actress Taye Hansberry. Her cousin is the flutist, percussionist, and composer Aldridge Hansberry.

Hansberry was the godmother to Nina Simone's daughter Lisa.

Education and political involvement

Hansberry graduated from Betsy Ross Elementary in 1944 and from Englewood High School in 1948. She attended the University of Wisconsin–Madison, where she immediately became politically active with the Communist Party USA and integrated a dormitory. Hansberry's classmate Bob Teague remembered her as "the only girl I knew who could whip together a fresh picket sign with her own hands, at a moment's notice, for any cause or occasion".

She worked on Henry A. Wallace's Progressive Party presidential campaign in 1948, despite her mother's disapproval. She spent the summer of 1949 in Mexico, studying painting at the University of Guadalajara.

Move to New York City

In 1950, Hansberry decided to leave Madison and pursue her career as a writer in New York City, where she attended The New School. She moved to Harlem in 1951 and became involved in activist struggles such as the fight against evictions.

Freedom newspaper and activism

In 1951, Hansberry joined the staff of the black newspaper Freedom, edited by Louis E. Burnham and published by Paul Robeson. At Freedom, she worked with W. E. B. Du Bois, whose office was in the same building, and other Black Pan-Africanists. At the newspaper, she worked as a "subscription clerk, receptionist, typist, and editorial assistant" besides writing news articles and editorials.

Additionally, she wrote scripts at Freedom.  To celebrate the newspaper's first birthday, Hansberry wrote the script for a rally at Rockland Palace, a then-famous Harlem hall, on "the history of the Negro newspaper in America and its fighting role in the struggle for a people's freedom, from 1827 to the birth of FREEDOM." Performers in this pageant included Paul Robeson, his longtime accompanist Lawrence Brown, the multi-discipline artist Asadata Dafora, and numerous others.  The following year, she collaborated with the already produced playwright Alice Childress, who also wrote for Freedom, on a pageant for its Negro History Festival, with Harry Belafonte, Sidney Poitier, Douglas Turner Ward, and John O. Killens.  This is her earliest remaining theatrical work.

Like Robeson and many black civil rights activists, Hansberry understood the struggle against white supremacy to be interlinked with the program of the Communist Party.  One of her first reports covered the Sojourners for Truth and Justice convened in Washington, D.C., by Mary Church Terrell. Hansberry traveled to Georgia to cover the case of Willie McGee, and was inspired to write the poem "Lynchsong" about his case.

Hansberry worked on not only the US civil rights movement, but also global struggles against colonialism and imperialism. She wrote in support of the Mau Mau Uprising in Kenya, criticizing the mainstream press for its biased coverage.

Hansberry often explained these global struggles in terms of female participants. She was particularly interested in the situation of Egypt, "the traditional Islamic 'cradle of civilization,' where women had led one of the most important fights anywhere for the equality of their sex."

In 1952, Hansberry attended a peace conference in Montevideo, Uruguay, in place of Robeson, who had been denied travel rights by the State Department.

Marriage and personal life

On June 20, 1953, Hansberry married Robert Nemiroff, a Jewish publisher, songwriter, and political activist. Hansberry and Nemiroff moved to Greenwich Village, the setting of her second Broadway play, The Sign in Sidney Brustein's Window. On the night before their wedding in 1953, Nemiroff and Hansberry protested against the execution of Julius and Ethel Rosenberg in New York City. 

The success of the hit pop song "Cindy, Oh Cindy", co-authored by Nemiroff, enabled Hansberry to start writing full-time. Although the couple separated in 1957 and divorced in 1962, their professional relationship lasted until Hansberry's death.

Hansberry was a closeted lesbian. Before her marriage, she had written in her personal notebooks about her attraction to women. In 1957, around the time she separated from Nemiroff, Hansberry contacted the Daughters of Bilitis, the San Francisco-based lesbian rights organization, contributing two letters to their magazine, The Ladder, both of which were published under her initials, first "L.H.N." and then "L.N." Pointing to these letters as evidence, some gay and lesbian writers credited Hansberry as having been involved in the homophile movement or as having been an activist for gay rights.  According to Kevin J. Mumford, however, beyond reading homophile magazines and corresponding with their creators, "no evidence has surfaced" to support claims that Hansberry was directly involved in the movement for gay and lesbian civil equality. 

Mumford stated that Hansberry's lesbianism caused her to feel isolated while A Raisin in the Sun catapulted her to fame; still, while "her impulse to cover evidence of her lesbian desires sprang from other anxieties of respectability and conventions of marriage, Hansberry was well on her way to coming out." Near the end of her life, she declared herself "committed [to] this homosexuality thing" and vowing to "create my life—not just accept it". Before her death, she built a circle of gay and lesbian friends, took several lovers, vacationed in Provincetown (where she enjoyed, in her words, "a gathering of the clan"), and subscribed to several homophile magazines. Hansberry's atheist views were expressed within her dramas, particularly A Raisin in the Sun. Critics and historians have contextualised the humanist themes of her work within a broader history of Black atheist literature and a wider English language humanist tradition.

In 1964, Hansberry and Nemiroff divorced but continued to work together.  Upon his ex-wife's death, Robert Nemiroff donated all of Hansberry's personal and professional effects to the New York Public Library. In doing so, he blocked access to all materials related to Hansberry's lesbianism, meaning that no scholars or biographers had access for more than 50 years. In 2013, Nemiroff's daughter released the restricted materials to Kevin J. Mumford, who explored Hansberry's self-identification in subsequent work.

Success as playwright

Written and completed in 1957, A Raisin in the Sun opened at the Ethel Barrymore Theatre on March 11, 1959, becoming the first play by an African-American woman to be produced on Broadway. The 29-year-old author became the youngest American playwright and only the fifth woman to receive the New York Drama Critics Circle Award for Best Play. She was also nominated for the Tony Award for Best Play, among the four Tony Awards that the play was nominated for in 1960. Over the next two years, Raisin was translated into 35 languages and was being performed all over the world.

In April 1959, as a sign of her sudden fame just one month after A Raisin in the Sun premiered on Broadway, photographer David Attie did an extensive photo-shoot of Hansberry for Vogue magazine, in the apartment at 337 Bleecker Street where she had written Raisin, which produced many of the best-known images of her today. In her award-winning Hansberry biography Looking for Lorraine: The Radiant and Radical Life of Lorraine Hansberry, Imani Perry writes that in his "gorgeous" images, "Attie captured her intellectual confidence, armour, and remarkable beauty."

Hansberry wrote two screenplays of Raisin, both of which were rejected as controversial by Columbia Pictures. Commissioned by NBC in 1960 to create a television program about slavery, Hansberry wrote The Drinking Gourd. This script was called "superb" but also rejected.

In 1960, during Delta Sigma Theta's 26th national convention in Chicago, Hansberry was made an honorary member.

In 1961, Hansberry was set to replace Vinnette Carroll as the director of the musical Kicks and Co, after its try-out at Chicago's McCormick Place. Written by Oscar Brown, Jr., the show featured an interracial cast including Lonnie Sattin, Nichelle Nichols, Vi Velasco, Al Freeman, Jr., Zabeth Wilde, and Burgess Meredith in the title role of Mr. Kicks. A satire involving miscegenation, the $400,000 production was co-produced by her husband Robert Nemiroff. Despite a warm reception in Chicago, the show never made it to Broadway.

In 1963, Hansberry participated in a meeting with Attorney General Robert F. Kennedy, set up by James Baldwin. Also in 1963, Hansberry was diagnosed with pancreatic cancer. She underwent two operations, on June 24 and August 2. Neither of the surgeries was successful in removing the cancer.

Hansberry agreed to speak to the winners of a creative writing conference on May 1, 1964: "Though it is a thrilling and marvelous thing to be merely young and gifted in such times, it is doubly so, doubly dynamic — to be young, gifted and black."

While many of her other writings were published in her lifetime — essays, articles, and the text for the SNCC book The Movement: Documentary of a Struggle for Equality — the only other play given a contemporary production was The Sign in Sidney Brustein's Window. It ran for 101 performances on Broadway and closed the night she died.

Beliefs
According to historian Fanon Che Wilkins, "Hansberry believed that gaining civil rights in the United States and obtaining independence in colonial Africa were two sides of the same coin that presented similar challenges for Africans on both sides of the Atlantic." In response to the independence of Ghana, led by Kwame Nkrumah, Hansberry wrote: "The promise of the future of Ghana is that of all the colored peoples of the world; it is the promise of freedom."

Regarding tactics, Hansberry said blacks "must concern themselves with every single means of struggle: legal, illegal, passive, active, violent and non-violent... They must harass, debate, petition, give money to court struggles, sit-in, lie-down, strike, boycott, sing hymns, pray on steps—and shoot from their windows when the racists come cruising through their communities."

James Baldwin described Hansberry's 1963 meeting with Robert F. Kennedy, in which Hansberry asked for a "moral commitment" on civil rights from Kennedy. According to Baldwin, Hansberry stated: "I am not worried about black men--who have done splendidly, it seems to me, all things considered....But I am very worried...about the state of the civilization which produced that photograph of the white cop standing on that Negro woman's neck in Birmingham."

In a Town Hall debate on June 15, 1964, Hansberry criticized white liberals who could not accept civil disobedience, expressing a need to "encourage the white liberal to stop being a liberal and become an American radical." At the same time, she said, "some of the first people who have died so far in this struggle have been white men."

Hansberry was a critic of existentialism, which she considered too distant from the world's economic and geopolitical realities. Along these lines, she wrote a critical review of Richard Wright's The Outsider and went on to style her final play Les Blancs as a foil to Jean Genet's absurdist Les Nègres. However, Hansberry admired Simone de Beauvoir's The Second Sex.

In 1959, Hansberry commented that women who are "twice oppressed" may become "twice militant". She held out some hope for male allies of women, writing in an unpublished essay: "If by some miracle women should not ever utter a single protest against their condition there would still exist among men those who could not endure in peace until her liberation had been achieved."

Hansberry was appalled by the nuclear bombing of Hiroshima and Nagasaki, which took place while she was in high school. She expressed a desire for a future in which "Nobody fights. We get rid of all the little bombs—and the big bombs," though she also believed in the right of people to defend themselves with force against their oppressors.

The FBI began surveillance of Hansberry when she prepared to go to the Montevideo peace conference. The Washington, D.C., office searched her passport files "in an effort to obtain all available background material on the subject, any derogatory information contained therein, and a photograph and complete description," while officers in Milwaukee and Chicago examined her life history. Later, an FBI reviewer of Raisin in the Sun highlighted its Pan-Africanist themes as "dangerous".

Death
Hansberry died of pancreatic cancer on January 12, 1965, aged 34. James Baldwin believed "it is not at all farfetched to suspect that what she saw contributed to the strain which killed her, for the effort to which Lorraine was dedicated is more than enough to kill a man."

Hansberry's funeral was held in Harlem on January 15, 1965. Paul Robeson and SNCC organizer James Forman gave eulogies. The presiding minister, Eugene Callender, recited a message from Baldwin, and also a message from the Reverend Martin Luther King Jr. that read: "Her creative ability and her profound grasp of the deep social issues confronting the world today will remain an inspiration to generations yet unborn." The 15th was also Dr. King's birthday. She is buried at Asbury United Methodist Church Cemetery in Croton-on-Hudson, New York.

Posthumous works
Hansberry's ex-husband, Robert Nemiroff, became the executor for several unfinished manuscripts. He added minor changes to complete the play Les Blancs, which Julius Lester termed her best work, and he adapted many of her writings into the play To Be Young, Gifted and Black, which was the longest-running Off Broadway play of the 1968–69 season. It appeared in book form the following year under the title To Be Young, Gifted and Black: Lorraine Hansberry in Her Own Words. She left behind an unfinished novel and several other plays, including The Drinking Gourd and What Use Are Flowers?, with a range of content, from slavery to a post-apocalyptic future.

When Nemiroff donated Hansberry's personal and professional effects to the New York Public Library, he "separated out the lesbian-themed correspondence, diaries, unpublished manuscripts, and full runs of the homophile magazines and restricted them from access to researchers." In 2013, more than twenty years after Nemiroff's death, the new executor released the restricted material to scholar Kevin J. Mumford.

Legacy

In 1973, a musical based on A Raisin in the Sun, entitled Raisin, opened on Broadway, with music by Judd Woldin, lyrics by Robert Brittan, and a book by Nemiroff and Charlotte Zaltzberg. The show ran for more than two years and won two Tony Awards, including Best Musical.

In 2004, A Raisin in the Sun was revived on Broadway in a production starring Sean "P. Diddy" Combs, Phylicia Rashad, and Audra McDonald, and directed by Kenny Leon. The production won Tony Awards for Best Actress in a Play for Rashad and Best Featured Actress in a Play for McDonald, and received a nomination for Best Revival of a Play. In 2008, the production was adapted for television with the same cast, winning two NAACP Image Awards.

In 2014, the play was revived on Broadway again in a  production starring Denzel Washington, directed again by Kenny Leon; it won three Tony Awards, for Best Revival of a Play, Best Featured Actress in a Play for Sophie Okonedo, and Best Direction of a Play.

In 1969, Nina Simone first released a song about Hansberry called "To Be Young, Gifted and Black." The title of the song refers to the title of Hansberry's autobiography, which Hansberry first coined when speaking to the winners of a creative writing conference on May 1, 1964: "Though it is a thrilling and marvelous thing to be merely young and gifted in such times, it is doubly so, doubly dynamic — to be young, gifted and black." Simone wrote the song with the poet Weldon Irvine and told him that she wanted lyrics that would "make black children all over the world feel good about themselves forever." When Irvine read the lyrics after it was finished, he thought, "I didn't write this. God wrote it through me." A studio recording by Simone was released as a single and the first live recording on October 26, 1969, was captured on Black Gold (1970). The single reached the top 10 of the R&B charts. In the introduction of the live version, Simone explains the difficulty of losing a close friend and talented artist.

Patricia and Fredrick McKissack wrote a children's biography of Hansberry, Young, Black, and Determined, in 1998.

In 1999 Hansberry was posthumously inducted into the Chicago Gay and Lesbian Hall of Fame.

In 2002, scholar Molefi Kete Asante listed Hansberry in the biographical dictionary 100 Greatest African Americans.

The Lorraine Hansberry Theatre of San Francisco, which specializes in original stagings and revivals of African-American theatre, is named in her honor.

Lincoln University's first-year female dormitory is named Lorraine Hansberry Hall. There is a school in the Bronx called Lorraine Hansberry Academy, and an elementary school in St. Albans, Queens, New York, named after Hansberry as well.

On the eightieth anniversary of Hansberry's birth, Adjoa Andoh presented a BBC Radio 4 program entitled Young, Gifted and Black in tribute to her life.

Founded in 2004 and officially launched in 2006, The Hansberry Project of Seattle, Washington was created as an African-American theatre lab, led by African-American artists and was designed to provide the community with consistent access to the African-American artistic voice. A Contemporary Theatre (ACT) was their first incubator and in 2012 they became an independent organization. The Hansberry Project is rooted in the convictions that black artists should be at the center of the artistic process, that the community deserves excellence in its art, and that theatre's fundamental function is to put people in a relationship with one another. Their goal is to create a space where the entire community can be enriched by the voices of professional black artists, reflecting autonomous concerns, investigations, dreams, and artistic expression.

In 2010, Hansberry was inducted into the Chicago Literary Hall of Fame.

In 2013, Hansberry was inducted into the Legacy Walk, an outdoor public display that celebrates LGBT history and people. This made her the first Chicago native to be honored along the North Halsted corridor.

Also in 2013, Hansberry was inducted into the American Theatre Hall of Fame.

Lorraine Hansberry Elementary School was located in the Ninth Ward of New Orleans. Heavily damaged by Hurricane Katrina in 2005, it has since closed.

In 2017, Hansberry was inducted into the National Women's Hall of Fame.

In January 2018, the PBS series American Masters released a new documentary, Lorraine Hansberry: Sighted Eyes/Feeling Heart, directed by Tracy Heather Strain.

On September 18, 2018, the biography Looking for Lorraine: The Radiant and Radical Life of Lorraine Hansberry, written by scholar Imani Perry, was published by Beacon Press.

On June 9, 2022, the Lilly Awards Foundation unveiled a statue of Hansberry in Times Square. The statue will be sent on a tour of major US cities.

Works
 A Raisin in the Sun (1959)
 A Raisin in the Sun, screenplay (1961)
 "On Summer" (essay) (1960)
 The Drinking Gourd (1960)
 What Use Are Flowers? (written c. 1962)
 The Arrival of Mr. Todog – a parody of Waiting for Godot
 The Movement: Documentary of a Struggle for Equality (1964)
 The Sign in Sidney Brustein's Window (1965)
 To Be Young, Gifted and Black: Lorraine Hansberry in Her Own Words (1969)
 Les Blancs: The Collected Last Plays / by Lorraine Hansberry. Edited by Robert Nemiroff (1994)
 Toussaint. This fragment from a work in progress, unfinished at the time of Hansberry's untimely death, deals with a Haitian plantation owner and his wife whose lives are soon to change drastically as a result of the revolution of Toussaint L'Ouverture. (From the Samuel French, Inc. catalog of plays.)

See also
 African American literature
 Clybourne Park
 Existentialist feminism

References

Sources
 Anderson, Michael. "Lorraine Hansberry's Freedom Family". American Communist History 7(2), 2008.
 Carter, Stephen R. "Commitment amid Complexity: Lorraine Hansberry's Life in Action". MELUS 7(3), Autumn 1980. Accessed December 25, 2013, via JStor.
 Wilkins, Fanon Che, "Beyond Bandung: The Critical Nationalism of Lorraine Hansberry, 1950 – 1965". Radical History Review 95, Spring 2006. Accessed December 24, 2013 via Duke University Press.
 Higashida, Cheryl. Black Internationalist Feminism: Women Writers of the Black Left, 1955–1995. Urbana: University of Illinois Press, 2011.

Further reading
 Soyica Diggs Colbert, Radical Vision: A Biography of Lorraine Hansberry (Yale University Press, 2021)
Higashida, Cheryl, "To Be (come) Young, Gay, and Black: Lorraine Hansberry's Existentialist Routes to Anticolonialism", American Quarterly, 60 (December 2008), 899–924.
 Perry, Imani (2018). Looking for Lorraine: The Radiant and Radical Life of Lorraine Hansberry. Beacon Press. .
 Tripp, Janet (1997). Lorraine Hansberry. Lucent Books (Young Adult). .

External links

 Lorraine Hansberry Literary Trust with extensive bibliography, numerous quotations, photograph gallery, biography 
 Guide to the Lorraine Hansberry papers at the New York Public Library
 "The Black Revolution and the White Backlash" (audio with transcript) – speech by Lorraine Hansberry, Forum at Town Hall sponsored by The Association of Artists for Freedom, New York City, June 15, 1964
 
Voices from the Gaps: Women Writers of Color – Lorraine Hansberry, University of Minnesota

Twice Militant: Lorraine Hansberry's Letters to "The Ladder" – Brooklyn Museum exhibition, November 2013 – March 2014
 
 FBI files on Lorraine Hansberry
 Sighted Eyes/Feeling Heart documentary on Hansberry
 Freedom, 1951–55, New York University digital archive. Monthly newspaper published by Paul Robeson and Louis Burnham. Lorraine Hansberry, "subscription clerk, receptionist, typist, and editorial assistant."
Materials about Lorraine Hansberry in the Richard Hoffman - Lorraine Hansberry collection held by Special Collections, University of Delaware Library

1930 births
1965 deaths
African-American atheists
African-American dramatists and playwrights
American atheists
American civil rights activists
Deaths from cancer in New York (state)
Deaths from pancreatic cancer
American lesbian writers
LGBT African Americans
LGBT people from Illinois
University of Wisconsin–Madison alumni
American women dramatists and playwrights
Writers from Chicago
American LGBT dramatists and playwrights
20th-century American dramatists and playwrights
20th-century American women writers
People from Greenwich Village
Englewood Technical Prep Academy alumni
Daughters of Bilitis members
20th-century African-American women writers
20th-century African-American writers
20th-century American LGBT people
African-American history of Westchester County, New York
Activists for African-American civil rights
American civil rights activists (civil rights movement)